Manifestation is the fourth full-length studio album by Cloak of Altering, released on December 4, 2015 by Crucial Blast.

Track listing

Personnel
Adapted from the Manifestation liner notes.
 Maurice de Jong (as Mories) – vocals, effects, recording, cover art

Release history

References

External links 
 Manifestation at Discogs (list of releases)
 Manifestation at Bandcamp

2015 albums
Cloak of Altering albums